Ženski rukometni klub Borac (Serbian Cyrillic: Женски рукометни клуб Борац) is a handball club from Banja Luka, Republika Srpska, Bosnia and Herzegovina. It is part of the Borac sports society.
The club competes in the Handball Championship of Bosnia and Herzegovina. 
With seven national titles won, it is one of the most successful teams in the country.

Honours
Handball Championship of Bosnia and Herzegovina:
  Winners (7):  	2007, 2008, 2009, 2010, 2011, 2012, 2021
First League of Republika Srpska:
Winners (1): 2019
Handball Cup of Bosnia and Herzegovina:
  Winners (7): 2004, 2008, 2009, 2010, 2012, 2013, 2021

Recent seasons
The recent season-by-season performance of the club:

Key

Coaching history

Nikola Bijelić
Rade Unčanin

References

External links 
ŽRK Borac
 EHF Club profile
Sport in Banja Luka
Bosnia and Herzegovina handball clubs
Handball clubs established in 1955
1955 establishments in Bosnia and Herzegovina